Robert Mitchell Gillespie is a former Assistant Secretary of the North Carolina Department of Environment and Natural Resources, and a former Republican member of the North Carolina General Assembly.  He represented the eighty-fifth district in the North Carolina House of Representatives, including constituents in Burke, Caldwell and McDowell counties.  A small business owner from Marion, North Carolina, Gillespie served seven terms in the state House and was re-elected to an eighth term, but resigned to take his position in the executive branch in January 2013.

Recent electoral history

2012

2010

2008

2006

2004

2002

2000

References

External links

|-

Republican Party members of the North Carolina House of Representatives
Living people
1959 births
21st-century American politicians
People from Marion, North Carolina